In the Shadow of a Legend: Dilip Kumar is a biographical book and memoir about the life of actor, filmmaker, and politician Dilip Kumar. The book is written by Faisal Farooqui and published by Om Books International. The book focuses on the life of the late Kumar offscreen, chronicling little-known anecdotes from his private life.

Synopsis 
The book revolves around Dilip Kumar’s personal life and some important life events. Born as Mohammad Yusuf Khan, the book reveals that the actor never let his identity of Yusuf Khan become bigger than his identity as Dilip Kumar. Character sketches such as how Kumar was a shy and hardworking young man, respected all religions, and suffered from the trauma of early childhood following socio-political events of the 1930s and 1940s, to the time when he acted in his first scene on camera are well narrated in the book. The book traces Dilip Kumar's personality from Farooqui’s interaction with him over decades-long family friendship.

Development and Release 
The book was written by Farooqui over many years but was released on the first death anniversary of the actor on July 7th, 2022 by Om Books International. The book was developed more as a personal account of Kumar, than chronicling his life on screen.

Critical reception 
Vijay Lokapally, reviewing the book in the Business Line,  notes that "In the book, Dilip Kumar: In the Shadow of a Legend, the author paints an intimate portrait of the actor, throwing light on some little-known anecdotes from his illustrious life. The book brings to us the real Dilip Kumar, away from the large screen that made him such an endearing figure for his fans." Times of India called it "Dilip Kumar: In the Shadow of a Legend' is an intimate portrait of the man behind the legend, a star who captivated audiences with his performances for over seventy years." 

Meher Bhatia from Indian Express notes that "the book uncovers the real Dilip Kumar with his passion and vulnerabilities."

References 

2022 non-fiction books